Thirza is a female given name, a variant of Tirzah, and may refer to

People
Thirza Nash (1885–1962), a South African novelist
Lilian Thirza Charlotte Holt (1898–1983), a British artist
TJ Cuthand (born 1978, originally Thirza Cuthand), a Canadian film-maker
Thirza Petty, the wife of John Petty (1807–1868)

Fictional people
Thirza Tapper, a character in The Farmer's Wife

Wildlife
Anetia thirza, a butterfly

See also
Thurza